Adams Township is one of the twenty townships of Darke County, Ohio, United States. The 2010 census found 3,441 people in the township, 2,163 of whom lived in the unincorporated portions of the township.

Geography
Located in the eastern part of the county, it borders the following townships:
Wayne Township - north
Newberry Township, Miami County - east
Newton Township, Miami County - southeast corner
Franklin Township - south
Van Buren Township - southwest
Greenville Township - west
Richland Township - northwest

Two incorporated villages are located in Adams Township: part of Bradford in the east, and Gettysburg in the south.

Name and history
Adams Township was established in 1819. This township was named for Major Adams, an early settler. It is one of ten Adams Townships statewide. A historic site in Adams Township is Bear's Mill.  Located along Greenville Creek in southwestern Adams Township, it is a working gristmill that was built in the 1840s.

Government
The township is governed by a three-member board of trustees, who are elected in November of odd-numbered years to a four-year term beginning on the following January 1. Two are elected in the year after the presidential election and one is elected in the year before it. There is also an elected township fiscal officer, who serves a four-year term beginning on April 1 of the year after the election, which is held in November of the year before the presidential election. Vacancies in the fiscal officership or on the board of trustees are filled by the remaining trustees.  The current trustees are David Brewer, Claude Fenstermaker, and Donald Lecklider, and the clerk is Charity Hutt.

References

External links
County website

Townships in Darke County, Ohio
Townships in Ohio